Smoky Lake County is a municipal district in north-eastern Alberta, Canada. Located in Census Division No. 12, its municipal office is located in the Town of Smoky Lake.

Geography

Communities and localities 
The following urban municipalities are surrounded by Smoky Lake County.
Cities
none
Towns
Smoky Lake
Villages
Vilna
Waskatenau
Summer villages
none

The following hamlets are located within Smoky Lake County.
Hamlets
Bellis
Edwand
Spedden
Warspite (dissolved from village status in June 2000)

The following Métis settlements are located within Smoky Lake County.
Buffalo Lake
Kikino

The following localities are located within Smoky Lake County.
Localities

Anning
Barich
Birchland Resort
Bonnie Lake Resort
Cache Lake
Cadron
Cossack
Downing
Hamlin
Kikino
Lobstick Settlement
Mons Lake
Mons Lake Estates
Mons View Resort

North Kotzman
Northbank
Pakan
Parkview Beach
Sprucefield
Stry
Two Lakes
Victoria Settlement (also Fort Victoria)
Wahstao
Wasel
Whiteman Beach

Demographics 

As a census subdivision in the 2016 Census of Population conducted by Statistics Canada, Smoky Lake County had a population of 4,107 living in 1,556 of its 2,248 total private dwellings, a  change from its 2011 population of 3,910. This includes the population of two Métis settlements, Buffalo Lake (712) and Kikino (934), located within the census subdivision that are municipalities independent of Smoky Lake County.

See also 
List of communities in Alberta

References

External links 

 
Municipal districts in Alberta